Matla-ul-fajr (Arabic مطلع‌الفجر lit. Rise of Dawn) is an Iranian VHF 3D radar. It was first seen in military parades. It was stated that Matla-ul-fajr covered the whole Persian Gulf. The range of Matla-ul-Fajr-1 is 300 km and the max altitude is 20,000 m. When fully set up, the height of the system reaches eight meters and it uses 12 "Yagi" antennas installed in two rows. The whole system, containing the antennas, setup instruments, processing, controlling and displaying units, communication devices and power generator are all installed on a trailer to achieve a very good mobility. The radar is also equipped with ECCM to survive in an e-warfare environment.

Matla-ul-fajr can use 100 different frequencies in the VHF band to operate in jammed environments.

In the same year, a project to enhance the capabilities of radar was started by SAIRAN and Isfahan University of Technology. Production of this model called Matla-ul-fajr 2 was started in 2012.

State-owned Mashregh News reported that Matla-ul-fajr 2 is a solid state 3D radar operating in VHF band. Due to the nature of its frequency, it can detect low-Radar cross-section targets such as stealth aircraft and cruise missiles with low accuracy at shorter ranges. This radar won the first place in Kwarazmi International Festival.

See also
Military of Iran
Iranian military industry
Current Equipment of the Iranian Army
Iran Electronics Industries

References

External links
Picture
Picture
Picture

Ground radars
Military radars of Iran
Military equipment introduced in the 2010s